Karniowice  is a village in the administrative district of Gmina Zabierzów, within Kraków County, Lesser Poland Voivodeship, in southern Poland. The village is located in the historical region Galicia.

The village has an approximate population of 841.

References

Villages in Kraków County